4 Stands Up is a BBC radio comedy show which first aired December 2007. The programme, which was broadcast on Thursdays at 6:30 pm on BBC Radio 4, contains stand up material from three comedy acts each show, with additional material from the show's host. The host remains consistent throughout the series, and the role has so far been filled by Michael McIntyre, Rhod Gilbert and Chris Addison.

4 Stands Up falls within a family of comedy programmes produced for BBC Radio 4, including 4 At The Store, 4 In A Field and 4 At The Fringe.

Episode guide

References

External links

BBC Radio comedy programmes